The Hotel Ross is an old hotel in the Chilean city of Pichilemu. It was created by Agustín Ross Edwards in 1885,  and remodeled in December 1987.

The park is located on Agustín Ross Avenue, in front of the old Ross Casino. The hotel was originally named Great Hotel Pichilemu. The once grand Ross Hotel was constructed at the same time. Although the hotel, one of the oldest in Chile, is still partially open to guests, it is in a high state of disrepair.

It is a National Monument of Chile, as part of the Sector de Pichilemu typical zone.

See also

Agustín Ross Cultural Center
Agustín Ross Park

References

External links
 Official website 

Hotels in Chile
Buildings and structures in Pichilemu
Hotel buildings completed in 1885
Organizations based in Pichilemu